In Euclidean geometry, two-dimensional rotations and reflections are two kinds of Euclidean plane isometries which are related to one another.

A rotation in the plane can be formed by composing a pair of reflections. First reflect a point  to its image  on the other side of line . Then reflect  to its image  on the other side of line . I.e., angle  will measure .

A pair of rotations about the same point  will be equivalent to another rotation about point .  On the other hand, the composition of a reflection and a rotation, or of a rotation and a reflection (composition is not commutative), will be equivalent to a reflection.

The statements above can be expressed more mathematically. Let these rotations and reflections operate on all points on the plane, and let these points be represented by position vectors. Then a rotation can be represented as a matrix,

and likewise for a reflection,

With these definitions of coordinate rotation and reflection, the following four identities hold:

These equations can be proved through straightforward matrix multiplication and application of trigonometric identities, specifically the sum and difference identities.

The set of all reflections in lines through the origin and rotations about the origin, together with the operation of composition of reflections and rotations, forms a group.  The group has an identity: .  Every rotation  has an inverse .  Every reflection  is its own inverse.  Composition has closure and is associative, since matrix multiplication is associative.

Notice that both  and  have been represented with orthogonal matrices.  These matrices all have a determinant whose absolute value is unity.  Rotation matrices have a determinant of +1, and reflection matrices have a determinant of −1.

The set of all orthogonal two-dimensional matrices together with matrix multiplication form the orthogonal group: .

The following table gives examples of rotation and reflection matrix :

See also
Orthogonal group
Euclidean symmetries
Euclidean plane isometry
Dihedral group
Cartan–Dieudonné theorem
Rotation group SO(3) – 3 dimensions

Euclidean symmetries